David Frederick Ruddell Wilson (1871–1957) was an Irish Anglican priest  and hymnist. He was Dean of St. Patrick's Cathedral, Dublin in the Church of Ireland in the second quarter of the 20th century.

Born into an ecclesiastical family, he was educated at Trinity College, Dublin. Ordained in 1895, his first position was as a curate at St. Ann's Belfast. He was Succentor and then Precentor of St. Patrick's Cathedral, Dublin until 1914 when he became Rector of Drumcondra. He then held a similar post at Donnybrook until his elevation to the Deanery.

He died on 24 November 1957.

References

1871 births
1957 deaths
Alumni of Trinity College Dublin
Deans of St. Patrick's Cathedral, Dublin
20th-century Irish Anglican priests